De Cuyper is a surname, equivalent to English Cooper. Notable people with the surname include:

Alphons De Cuyper (1887–1950), Belgian sculptor and painter
Katrien De Cuyper (1967–c. 1991), Belgian homicide victim
Norbert De Cuyper (b. 1943), Belgian politician
Simon De Cuyper (b. 1986), Belgian triathlete

Occupational surnames